Salarias sexfilum is a species of combtooth blenny found in the western central Pacific ocean.

References

sexfilum
Taxa named by Albert Günther
Fish described in 1861